Martin Wyldeck (11 January 1914 – 29 April 1988) was an English  actor who played a wide range of parts over many years on stage, screen and TV.
He also appeared in the first episode of the TV series Fawlty Towers, as Sir Richard Morris.

Selected filmography

 Operation Diamond (1948) - Hugo
 My Wife's Lodger (1952) - Policeman
 Time Bomb (1953) - Sergeant Collins
 Deadly Nightshade (1953) - M.I.5 Man (uncredited)
 Street Corner (1953) - Desk Sgt. Forbes (uncredited)
 Will Any Gentleman...? (1953) - Commissionaire
 Knights of the Round Table (1953) - John (uncredited)
 The Embezzler (1954) - 2nd Police Sergeant (uncredited)
 Timeslip (1955) - Dr. Preston
 Now and Forever (1956) - Master of Ceremonies (uncredited)
 My Wife's Family (1956) - (uncredited)
 The Counterfeit Plan (1957) - (uncredited)
 The Devil's Pass (1957) - Young Master
 The Hypnotist (1957) - Doctor Bradford
 Carry On Sergeant (1958) - Mr. Sage (uncredited)
 Chain of Events (1958) - Becket
 Just Joe (1960) - Bill
 Doctor in Love (1960) - Police Officer (uncredited)
 A Story of David (1961) - Hezro
 The Frightened City (1961) - Security Officer
 Fate Takes a Hand (1961) - Doctor
 The Pot Carriers (1962) - Prison Officer Mullins
 The Girl on the Boat (1961) - J.P. Mortimer
 That Kind of Girl (1963) - Bates
 Night Must Fall (1964) - Inspector Willett
 The Return of Mr. Moto (1965) - Helmuth 'Dargo' Engel
 Robbery (1967) - Chief constable
 The Oblong Box (1969) - Constable
 The Bushbaby (1969) - Captain
 Cool It Carol! (1970) - Mr. Thatcher
 A Touch of the Other (1970) - Traylor
 Die Screaming, Marianne (1971) - British Police Detective - Grey Hair
 Universal Soldier (1972) - Wilson
 Four Dimensions of Greta (1972) - Herr Schickler
 Tiffany Jones (1973) - Brodsky
 Boys from the Blackstuff (1982) - Marley

References

External links
 

1914 births
1988 deaths
People from Warwickshire
English male film actors
20th-century English male actors